Kareem Ignacio López Contreras (born January 1, 1990), better known by his stage name, Karim Lopez, is a Mexican musician and singer, who became widely known as former member of the critically acclaimed musical group AK-7.

Early life

Kareem was born in Lindsay, California the second of four children, where he lived with his parents. When he was about 7 years old, his family relocated to Bakersfield, California. Growing up into a family a musicians, Kareem watched at an early age his father and uncles perform. He started playing the drums at age 8, and would eventually start playing percussion's at the age of 10 in his father's group. As he got older, he started becoming very interested in singing. His dad eventually started letting him come out of his shyness by letting him sing at times during their performances. It wasn't until age 14 when Kareem became the group's official singer. He went on to record 4 albums under an independent label while with the group.

Solo Career (2011–present)

Kareem returned to Nayarit, Mexico to start work on his first solo album. On October 1, 2011 his debut single and album were released. Both under the same name "Agridulce".

Discography
 Agridulce (2011)

Awards

AK-7
Lo Nuestro Awards
2009: Breakout Artist or Group of the Year [Won]

References

External links
www.facebook.com/kareem1190
www.twitter.com/kareemlopez1
www.youtube.com/kareemlopezoficial

1990 births
Living people
People from Lindsay, California
21st-century Mexican singers
21st-century Mexican male singers
People from Bakersfield, California